Black Roses (Swedish: Svarta rosor) is a 1932 Swedish drama film directed by Gustaf Molander and starring Ester Roeck-Hansen, Einar Axelsson and Karin Swanström.

The film's art direction was by Arne Åkermark.

Cast
 Ester Roeck-Hansen  as Inga Gustafsson  
 Einar Axelsson as Johannes Borin  
 Karin Swanström  as Tilda  
 Carl Barcklind  as Hampus Moberg 
 Nils Lundell as Edvin Jonsson  
 Sigurd Wallén  as Fernblom  
 Constance Byström  as Inga's Mother
 Eric Abrahamsson  as Gentleman with newspaper on bus  
 Anna-Lisa Berg  as Guest at dance restaurant  
 Helga Brofeldt  as Lady with laundry  
 Ossian Brofeldt as Guest at restaurant  
 Artur Cederborgh  as Laughing painter  
 Julia Cæsar  as Mrs. Karlsson  
 Bengt Edgren  as Boy with blonde curly hair 
 Emil Fjellström   as Skipper  
 Mona Geijer-Falkner  as Lady with laundry  
 Bengt-Olof Granberg  as Guest at dance restaurant 
 Sune Holmqvist as Schoolboy 
 Harry Isacsson  as Ljungmark - Student  
 Astrid Marmstedt as Guest at dance restaurant  
 Mim Persson  as Guest at restaurant  
 Holger Sjöberg  as Sailor at freight steamboat  
 Ruth Stevens  as Girl at freight steamboat  
 Helle Winther  as Boy on the street

References

Bibliography 
 Qvist, Per Olov & von Bagh, Peter. Guide to the Cinema of Sweden and Finland. Greenwood Publishing Group, 2000.

External links 

 

1932 films
Swedish drama films
1932 drama films
1930s Swedish-language films
Films directed by Gustaf Molander
Swedish black-and-white films
1930s Swedish films